The New Century Theatre was a Broadway theater in the Midtown Manhattan neighborhood of New York City, at 205–207 West 58th Street and 926–932 Seventh Avenue. Opened on October 6, 1921, as Jolson's 59th Street Theatre, the theater was designed by Herbert J. Krapp on the site of the Central Park Riding Academy. It was built for the Shubert brothers, who named the house after Al Jolson.

In 1920, the Shuberts announced plans to convert the Central Park Riding Academy into a theater, hiring Krapp to renovate the old structure. The Shuberts went bankrupt in 1931 and sold off Jolson's 59th Street Theatre, in part because of the venue's remoteness from Times Square. The venue was then leased as a film house called the Central Park Theatre. It was then renamed five more times before assuming the "New Century" name in 1944. The theater was converted to an NBC broadcast studio in 1953, then to a videotape studio in 1958. Upon the theater's demolition in 1962, the apartment building 200 Central Park South was erected on the site.

References

External links

1921 establishments in New York City
1962 disestablishments in New York (state)
Demolished buildings and structures in Manhattan
Demolished theatres in New York City
Former Broadway theatres
Former theatres in Manhattan
Midtown Manhattan
Seventh Avenue (Manhattan)
Theatres completed in 1921